The 1980 United States Senate election in Missouri was held on November 4, 1980. Incumbent Democrat Thomas Eagleton defeated Republican nominee Gene McNary with 52.00% of the vote. As of 2022, this is the last time the Democrats won the Class 3 Senate seat in Missouri.

Primary elections
Primary elections were held on August 5, 1980.

Democratic primary

Candidates
Thomas Eagleton, incumbent United States Senator
Lee C. Sutton, former State Representative
Herb Fillmore

Results

Republican primary

Candidates
Gene McNary, County Executive of St. Louis County
David Doctorian, State Senator
Morris Duncan
Gregory Hansman

Results

General election

Candidates
Major party candidates
Thomas Eagleton, Democratic
Gene McNary, Republican

Other candidates
Martha Pettit, Socialist Workers

Results

See also
1980 United States Senate elections

References

1980
Missouri
United States Senate